Fallon Cottage Annex is a historic cure cottage located at Saranac Lake, town of North Elba in Essex County, New York.  It was built in 1901 and is a -story, shingled frame house on a coursed fieldstone foundation.  It features a hipped roof with three cross gables, a small hipped roof dormer, and an octagonal turret or open cupola in the Queen Anne style.  It has a ten-bay verandah, one-third of which is a separate cure porch.  It was built as a single family residence and adapted for use as a cure cottage over time, operating as such after 1923.

It was listed on the National Register of Historic Places in 1992. It is located in the Helen Hill Historic District.

References

Houses on the National Register of Historic Places in New York (state)
Queen Anne architecture in New York (state)
Houses completed in 1901
Houses in Essex County, New York
National Register of Historic Places in Essex County, New York
Individually listed contributing properties to historic districts on the National Register in New York (state)